Cate Marvin is an American poet.

Life
She graduated from Marlboro College, University of Houston, University of Iowa, and University of Cincinnati with a Ph.D.
She has taught at the College of Staten Island, City University of New York and Columbia University. She teaches in the English Department of Colby College.

Her work has appeared in Ploughshares, Fence, The New England Review, Poetry, The Kenyon Review, The Paris Review, The Cincinnati Review, Slate, Verse, Boston Review, Ninth Letter, and TriQuarterly.

Awards
 2000 Kathryn A. Morton Prize, for World’s Tallest Disaster by Robert Pinsky
 2002 Kate Tufts Discovery Award from Claremont Graduate University.
 2007 NYFA Fellow
 2007 Whiting Award
 2015 Guggenheim Fellowship

Publications

Poems
 "I Live Where the Leaves Are Pointed", Fishouse
 "Azalea", Fishouse
 "Monsterful", Ploughshares, Spring 2007
 "Robotripping", Ploughshares, Spring 2006
 "I Live Where the Leaves Are Pointed", Ploughshares, Spring 2000
 "The Pet", Slate, January 14, 2003

Full-length poetry collections
 Chicanery: A Collection of Original Poems, University of Cincinnati 2003 (Unpublished dissertation)
 World’s Tallest Disaster, Sarabande Books 2001
 Fragment of the Head of a Queen, Sarabande Books 2007
 Oracle, WW Norton 2015

Editor
 with Michael Dumanis, Legitimate dangers: American poets of the new century, Sarabande Books 2006

References

External links
Profile at The Whiting Foundation
Poetry Foundation page.

Links to works
 "I Live Where the Leaves Are Pointed", Fishouse
 "Azalea", Fishouse
 "The Pet", Slate, Jan. 14, 2003
 
 
 
 

Year of birth missing (living people)
Living people
21st-century American poets
College of Staten Island faculty
Marlboro College alumni
University of Cincinnati alumni
University of Houston alumni
University of Iowa alumni
American women poets
21st-century American women writers